Bukit Selambau is a small town in Kuala Muda District, Kedah, Malaysia.

See also
Bukit Selambau by-election, 2009

Kuala Muda District
Towns in Kedah